Mohamed Ayman Ashour (born 12 December 1960) is the current Egyptian Minister of Higher Education and Scientific Research in the cabinet headed by Mostafa Madbouly in succession of Khaled Abdel Ghaffar.

Before appointing, Ashour had held the position of Deputy Minister of Higher Education for University Affairs. He also served as Dean of the Faculty of Engineering at Ain Shams University.

References

 

Higher education ministers of Egypt
Egyptian engineers
Living people
Ain Shams University alumni
Research ministers of Egypt
1960 births
21st-century Egyptian politicians